Last Nite is the debut  studio album by Nigerian recording artists P-Square, released in  2003 by Timbuk2 Music Label. The album produced two major singles – "Senorita" and "Igbedu". The duo and their elder brother, Jude Engees Okoye, produced the album. The album was sponsored by Benson & Hedges. On 10 October 2008, the album's reloaded version was released on iTunes and features a different album cover.

Singles 
"Senorita", the debut single from P-Square, features a music video directed by Jude Engees Okoye. The song received the most airplay from the album and showcased the duo's dancing skills. Michael Jackson inspired the duo to dance while growing up.
"Igbedu" is the second single from the duo's debut album. The music video was shot in Jos, Nigeria, and directed by their elder brother, Jude Engees Okoye.

Track listing

Re-release history

References

External links 

2003 debut albums
P-Square albums
Igbo-language albums